The 1991 World Table Tennis Championships – Swaythling Cup (men's team) was the 41st edition of the men's team championship.  

Sweden won the gold medal defeating Yugoslavia 3–2 in the final. Czechoslovakia won the bronze medal defeating the Belgium 3–1 in the bronze medal play off.  

The Swaythling Cup used the a new format during 1991. The new format had been voted in by 56 votes to 32 in 1989 and included a knockout phase for the final 16 teams.

Medalists

Final stage knockout phase

Last 16

Quarter finals

Semifinals

Third-place playoff

Final

See also
List of World Table Tennis Championships medalists

References

-